The 2021 Canadian Curling Pre-Trials Direct-Entry Event was held from September 22 to 26 at the RA Centre in Ottawa, Ontario. The event was held to qualify two men's teams and two women's teams for the 2021 Canadian Olympic Curling Pre-Trials.

Qualification process
Eight men's teams and eight women's team qualified for the event based on their ranking from the World Curling Team Rankings as of July 2021. Teams also had to have three of their four members from their 2020–21 season lineups still intact.

Men

Teams
The teams are listed as follows:

Knockout brackets

Source:

A event

B event

C event

Knockout results 
All draw times are listed in Eastern Time (UTC−04:00).

Draw 1
Wednesday, September 22, 12:00 pm

Draw 4
Thursday, September 23, 8:00 am

Draw 5
Thursday, September 23, 12:00 pm

Draw 7
Thursday, September 23, 8:00 pm

Draw 8
Friday, September 24, 8:00 am

Draw 10
Friday, September 24, 4:00 pm

Draw 12
Saturday, September 25, 9:00 am

Draw 14
Saturday, September 25, 5:00 pm

Playoffs

A vs. B
Saturday, September 25, 9:00 pm

Winner qualifies for 2021 Canadian Olympic Curling Pre-Trials.

Loser drops to second place game.

Second place game
Sunday, September 26, 1:30 pm

Winner qualifies for 2021 Canadian Olympic Curling Pre-Trials.

Women

Teams
The teams are listed as follows:

Knockout brackets

Source:

A event

B event

C event

Knockout results 
All draw times are listed in Eastern Time (UTC−04:00).

Draw 1
Wednesday, September 22, 12:00 pm

Draw 2
Wednesday, September 22, 3:30 pm

Draw 4
Thursday, September 23, 8:00 am

Draw 5
Thursday, September 23, 12:00 pm

Draw 6
Thursday, September 23, 4:00 pm

Draw 7
Thursday, September 23, 8:00 pm

Draw 8
Friday, September 24, 8:00 am

Draw 9
Friday, September 24, 12:00 pm

Draw 10
Friday, September 24, 4:00 pm

Draw 11
Friday, September 24, 8:00 pm

Draw 12
Saturday, September 25, 9:00 am

Draw 14
Saturday, September 25, 5:00 pm

Playoffs

A vs. B
Saturday, September 25, 5:00 pm

Winner qualifies for 2021 Canadian Olympic Curling Pre-Trials.

Loser drops to second place game.

Second place game
Sunday, September 26, 10:00 am

Winner qualifies for 2021 Canadian Olympic Curling Pre-Trials.

Notes

References

External links
 Info about Trials Qualification

2021 in Canadian curling
2021 in Ontario
Curling in Ottawa
September 2021 sports events in Canada
2020s in Ottawa